Tropidophorus grayi, commonly called the spiny waterside skink  or Gray's keeled skink, is a relatively common but secretive skink species, a lizard in the family Scincidae. The species is endemic to the Philippines.

Habitat
T. grayi lives by rivers and lakes, which gives it the common name waterside skink. Despite the warm climate in its native habitat, it prefers relatively cool temperatures in mountainous areas.

Description
T. grayi has serrated scales (very spiky) which are grey-black in colour, but may also appear in pure black, reddish-brown or wooden-brown colours. The belly is white with or without brown blotches and is smooth and shiny. This makes this species look like a miniature crocodile.

Behaviour
T. grayi is fast and agile. Despite its looks and speed, it is harmless, but it may occasionally bite hard, if handled. When threatened by predators this reptile hides in water. If left to swim in deep water, it may appear to drown, but it actually only plays dead. When removed, it may stay motionless for a few minutes and then return to its normal state. It is also an excellent climber, equipped with claws that can grip tree trunks and other wooden structures.

Diet
T. grayi eats worms, insects, small snails, slugs, and small fishes (if it can catch one).

In captivity
In captivity, it is observed that T. grayi likes to stack itself in piles, like turtles basking in the sun, and would rather stay on dry land than in water. It is becoming quite popular as an exotic pet due to its crocodilian appearance and cheap price in the Philippines.

Tail regeneration
Like almost any species in the skink family, T. grayi can regrow its tail if severed, but the replacement tail usually is shorter and has fewer spikes than the original tail. Also, the tail of T. grayi is tougher to break than the tail of most other skinks.

Etymology
The specific name, grayi, is in honor of British herpetologist John Edward Gray.

References

Further reading
Boulenger GA (1887). Catalogue of the Lizards in the British Museum (Natural History). Second Edition. Volume III. ... Scincidæ ... London: Trustees of the British Museum (Natural History). (Taylor and Francis, printers). xii + 575 pp. + Plates I-XL. (Tropidophorus grayi, p. 364 + Plate XXX, figures 2, 2a).
Günther A (1861). "Second List of Siamese Reptiles". Proc. Zool. Soc. London 1861: 187-189. (Tropidophorus grayi, new species, p. 189).

grayi
Reptiles of the Philippines
Reptiles described in 1861
Taxa named by Albert Günther